Theodoros Kontidis S.J. (born March 11, 1956) is the Roman Catholic Archbishop of Athens, apostolic administrator of Archdiocese of Rhodes and a Jesuit priest. He was appointed to the episcopate as Archbishop of Athens and Apostolic administrator of Rhodes on July 14, 2021.

Biography

Theodoros Kontidis was born in Thessaloniki in Greece, and was ordained as a Jesuit priest in 1988.

He was member of Pontifical Greek College of Saint Athanasius and studied philosophy and then theology at the Pontifical Gregorian University in Rome. In 1983 he entered the Jesuit order and was ordained priest on 9 October 1988 by the archbishop of Athens, Nikolaos Foskolos, in the church of the Sacred Heart. After further studies, he obtained a degree in theology from the Center Sèvres in Paris.

Father Kontidis was parish vicar and after pastor of the parish of the Sacred Heart of Jesus in Athens. In 1995 he made his solemn profession. He became responsible for the vocational pastoral and superior of the Jesuit community in Athens and director of the Manresa retreat house. Since 2021 he has been pastor of the parish of Sant'Andrew in Patras. In addition to his native Greek, he also Italian, French and English.

On July 14, 2021, Pope Francis appointed him Archbishop of Athens and Apostolic administrator of Rhodes.

References

External Links

 http://catholic-hierarchy.org/bishop/bkontidis.html
 http://www.gcatholic.org/dioceses/diocese/athe0.htm

1956 births
Roman Catholic archbishops of Athens
Living people
21st-century Roman Catholic archbishops
Pontifical Gregorian University alumni
People from Thessaloniki
Greek Roman Catholic archbishops
Greek Jesuits
Jesuit archbishops